Nitratireductor kimnyeongensis is a Gram-negative, aerobic, oxidase- and catalase-positive bacteria from the genus of Nitratireductor which was isolated from the Kimnyeong Beach in Jeju from the Republic of Korea.

References

External links
Type strain of Nitratireductor kimnyeongensis at BacDive -  the Bacterial Diversity Metadatabase

Phyllobacteriaceae
Bacteria described in 2009